Patrick McGill may refer to:
 Paddy McGill (1913–1977), Nationalist politician in Northern Ireland
 Paddy McGill (hurler) (born 1988), Irish hurler
 Patrick MacGill (1889–1963), Irish writer, known as the "navvy poet"
Pat McGill, wrestler with Stampede Wrestling
Pat McGill (Gaelic footballer), who played for Naomh Adhamhnáin and Donegal